The Eustis Commercial Historic District is a U.S. historic district (designated as such on July 6, 2005) located in Eustis, Florida. The district is bounded roughly by Lake Eustis, McDonald Avenue, Grove Street and Orange Avenue.

References

External links
 Lake County listings at National Register of Historic Places

National Register of Historic Places in Lake County, Florida
Historic districts on the National Register of Historic Places in Florida
Eustis, Florida
2005 establishments in Florida